Lakeview is a village in Cato Township in Montcalm County of the U.S. state of Michigan. The population was 1,007 at the 2010 census. The village is within Cato Township.

History
Lakeview was first settled in 1858 and platted in 1867 by Albert S. French, a settler from New York. It had been a Native American camp site. French named it for its location on the west side of Tamarack Lake. A post office was established on October 7, 1867, with Hiram S. Barton as its first postmaster. It was a station on the Chicago, Saginaw and Canada Railroad in 1879.

Geography

The Lakeview post office, with ZIP code 48850, serves most of Cato Township as well as part of Belvidere Township to the east, Douglass Township to the southeast, Pine Township to the south, and Winfield Township to the west. It also serves a large portion of Hinton Township to the north and Millbrook Township to the northeast in Mecosta County.

Demographics

2010 census
As of the census of 2010, there were 1,007 people, 438 households, and 259 families living in the village. The racial makeup of the village was 96.3% White, 0.4% African American, 0.4% Native American, 0.6% Asian, 0.2% Pacific Islander, 0.2% from other races, and 1.9% from two or more races. Hispanic or Latino of any race were 2.6% of the population.

There were 438 households, of which 27.9% had children under the age of 18 living with them, 39.3% were married couples living together, 16.7% had a female householder with no husband present, 3.2% had a male householder with no wife present, and 40.9% were non-families. 35.4% of all households were made up of individuals, and 16.7% had someone living alone who was 65 years of age or older. The average household size was 2.23 and the average family size was 2.86.

The median age in the village was 41.3 years. 23.1% of residents were under the age of 18; 9% were between the ages of 18 and 24; 21.8% were from 25 to 44; 24.9% were from 45 to 64; and 21.5% were 65 years of age or older. The gender makeup of the village was 46.2% male and 53.8% female.

2000 census
As of the census of 2000, there were 1,112 people, 396 households, and 287 families living in the village. The racial makeup of the village was 97.57% White, 0.09% African American, 0.45% Native American, 0.27% Asian, 0.72% from other races, and 0.90% from two or more races. Hispanic or Latino of any race were 3.06% of the population.

There were 396 households, out of which 36.1% had children under the age of 18 living with them, 53.0% were married couples living together, 15.7% had a female householder with no husband present, and 27.3% were non-families. 24.0% of all households were made up of individuals, and 15.7% had someone living alone who was 65 years of age or older.  The average household size was 2.67 and the average family size was 3.08.

In the village, the population was spread out, with 29.0% under the age of 18, 8.2% from 18 to 24, 26.5% from 25 to 44, 16.2% from 45 to 64, and 20.1% who were 65 years of age or older.  The median age was 36 years. For every 100 females, there were 81.4 males.  For every 100 females age 18 and over, there were 79.1 males.

The median income for a household in the village was $33,611, and the median income for a family was $38,594. Males had a median income of $28,681 versus $22,955 for females. The per capita income for the village was $14,154.  About 9.8% of families and 9.9% of the population were below the poverty line, including 12.8% of those under age 18 and 8.8% of those age 65 or over.

Climate
This climatic region is typified by large seasonal temperature differences, with warm to hot (and often humid) summers and cold (sometimes severely cold) winters.  According to the Köppen Climate Classification system, Lakeview has a humid continental climate, abbreviated "Dfb" on climate maps.

References

Villages in Montcalm County, Michigan
Villages in Michigan